Wieselgren is a surname of Swedish origin. People with that name include:

 Hans Wieselgren (born 1952), Swedish fencer who  competed at the 1972 Summer Olympics
 Harald Wieselgren (1835–1906), Swedish librarian and author
 Ing-Marie Wieselgren (1958-2022), Swedish psychiatrist
 Peter Wieselgren (1800–1877), Lutheran priest and leader of the Swedish temperance movement

See also
 

Surnames of Swedish origin